Hem Thon Ponleu (born 26 January 1990, Phnom Penh) is a Cambodian freestyle swimmer. He competed at the 2008 Summer Olympics and 2012 Summer Olympics. His niece Hem Thon Vitiny also swam in both Olympics.

See also
 Cambodia at the 2012 Summer Olympics

References

External links
 

1990 births
Living people
Sportspeople from Phnom Penh
Cambodian male freestyle swimmers
Olympic swimmers of Cambodia
Swimmers at the 2008 Summer Olympics
Swimmers at the 2012 Summer Olympics
Swimmers at the 2010 Asian Games
Swimmers at the 2014 Asian Games
Asian Games competitors for Cambodia
20th-century Cambodian people
21st-century Cambodian people